Batov is a Russian male surname, its feminine counterpart is Batova. Notable people with the surname include:

Maksim Batov (born 1992), Russian footballer
Pavel Batov (1897–1985), Russian general

Russian-language surnames